Turgay is a Turkish given name for males. People named Turgay include:

 Turgay Avcı, Turkish Cypriot politician
 Turgay Bahadır, Turkish-Austrian footballer
 Turgay Gemicibasi, Turkish footballer
 Turgay Semercioğlu, Turkish footballer
 Turgay Şeren, Turkish football manager

Turgay may also refer to:
 Turgay (river), a river in northern Kazakhstan
 Turgay Depression, a structural basin in Kazakhstan
 Turgay Plateau, in northern Kazakhstan
 Turgay Oblast (Russian Empire), a former administrative division

See also
 Tugay (disambiguation)
 Turgai (disambiguation)

Turkish masculine given names